The 1934 San Jose State Spartans football team represented State Teachers College at San Jose during the 1934 college football season.

San Jose State competed in the Far Western Conference (FWC). The team was led by head coach Dudley DeGroot, in his third year, and they played home games at Spartan Stadium in San Jose, California. They finished the season as co-champions of the FWC with a record of three wins, three losses and four ties (3–3–4, 2–0–3 FWC). The Spartans were outscored by their opponents 90–126 for the season.

Schedule

Notes

References

San Jose State
San Jose State Spartans football seasons
Northern California Athletic Conference football champion seasons
San Jose State Spartans football